Adam Gitsham (born 22 November 1978) is an Australian sports shooter. He competed in the men's 10 metre running target event at the 2000 Summer Olympics.

References

External links
 

1978 births
Living people
Australian male sport shooters
Olympic shooters of Australia
Shooters at the 2000 Summer Olympics
Sportsmen from Queensland